Lal Zimman is a linguist who works on sociocultural linguistics, sociophonetics, language, gender and identity, and transgender linguistics.

Education 
Zimman received his BA in Philosophy and MA in English with a Linguistics concentration from San Francisco State University. He received his PhD in linguistics from University of Colorado at Boulder in 2012 where he worked under Kira Hall. His dissertation, Voices in Transition: Testosterone, Transmasculinity, and the Gendered Voice among Female-to-Male Transgender People, used both ethnographic and sociophonetic methods to explore the effects of hormone therapy on the voices of trans men.

Career 
Zimman's work has been influential in developing the field of trans linguistics. He has been widely recognized for his work on inclusive language reform and activism, the relationship between the body, biological sex, and the voice, and pronouns and singular they.

Zimman is currently assistant professor of Linguistics & Affiliated Faculty in Feminist Studies, University of California, Santa Barbara. He is also General Editor for Studies in Language, Gender, and Sexuality for Oxford University Press.

In 2014, Zimman published a co-edited volume, Queer Excursions: Retheorizing Binaries in Language, Gender, and Sexuality (published by Oxford University Press), which won the Association for Queer Anthropology's Ruth Benedict Prize.

He has taught several classes on Sociocultural Linguistics, Language, Gender & Sexuality, and Sociophonetics. He has been interviewed for programs such as The Vocal Fries podcast.

Personal life 
Zimman was raised in the San Francisco Bay Area. Zimman is transgender and uses he or they pronouns.

Selected publications 

 Zimman, Lal (2019). Trans self-identification and the language of neoliberal selfhood: Agency, power, and the limits of monologic discourse. International Journal of the Sociology of Language 256(1):147-175.
 Zimman, Lal (2018). Pronouns and possibilities: Transgender language activism and reform. In Netta Avineri, Robin Conley, Laura R. Graham, Eric Johnson & Jonathan Rosa (Eds.), Language and Social Justice: Case Studies on Communication & the Creation of Just Societies. New York: Routledge. 176–183.
 Zimman, Lal (2018) Transgender voices: Insights on identity, embodiment, and the gender of the voice. Language and Linguistics Compass 12(7):e12284.
 Zimman, Lal (2018) Working with Transgender Communities. In Christine Mallinson, Becky Childs, & Gerard Van Herk (Eds.), Data Collection in Sociolinguistics: Methods and Applications. New York: Routledge. 49–52.
 Zimman, Lal (2014). The discursive construction of sex: Remaking and reclaiming the gendered body in talk about genitals among trans men. In Lal Zimman, Joshua Raclaw, and Jenny Davis (eds.), Queer Excursions: Retheorizing Binaries in Language, Gender, and Sexuality. Oxford University Press. 13–34.
 Davis, Jenny, Lal Zimman, and Joshua Raclaw (2014). Opposites attract: Retheorizing binaries in language, gender, and sexuality. In Lal Zimman, Jenny Davis, & Joshua Raclaw (Eds.), Queer Excursions: Retheorizing Binaries in Language, Gender, and Sexuality. Oxford University Press. 1–12.
 Edelman, Elijah & Lal Zimman (2014). Boycunts and bonus holes: Discourse about transmasculine bodies and the sexual productivity of genitals. Journal of Homosexuality 61(5):673-690. Special issue on Trans Sexualities, edited by Carla A. Pfeffer.
 Zimman, Lal (2013). Hegemonic masculinity and the variability of gay-sounding speech: The perceived sexuality of transgender men. Journal of Language & Sexuality2(1):1-39.
 Zimman, Lal & Kira Hall (2009). Language, embodiment, and the “third sex”. In Dominic Watt and Carmen Llamas (eds.), Language and Identities. Edinburgh: Edinburgh University Press. 166–178.
 Zimman, Lal (2009). “The other kind of coming out”: Transgender people and the coming out narrative genre. Gender and Language 3(1):53-80.

References 

Linguists from the United States
University of California, Santa Barbara faculty
University of Colorado Boulder alumni
San Francisco State University alumni
Transgender academics

Living people
Year of birth missing (living people)